Sean Russell Dawkins (born February 3, 1971) is a former American college and professional football player who was a wide receiver in National Football League (NFL) for nine seasons.  He played college football for the University of California, Berkeley, and was recognized as an All-American.  A first-round draft pick in the 1993 NFL Draft, he played professionally for the Indianapolis Colts, New Orleans Saints, Seattle Seahawks and Jacksonville Jaguars of the NFL.

Early years
Dawkins was born in Red Bank, New Jersey, but raised in Sunnyvale, California. He distinguished himself as a wide receiver at Homestead High School in Cupertino, California.

College career
He earned an athletic scholarship to attend the University of California, Berkeley, where he played for the California Golden Bears football team. While at Cal, Dawkins used his speed and size (6 feet 4 inches, 215 pounds) to establish himself as one of the country's most dangerous deep threats.  His first two seasons at California were unqualified successes for him personally, as well as his Golden Bear teammates.  In 1990, California won their first Bowl Game since 1938, defeating Wyoming in the Copper Bowl.  The following season, the Bears dominated nationally ranked Clemson in the Citrus Bowl, which earned them the No. 7 ranking in the final CNN/USA Today Coaches Poll, their highest finish since 1950.  It also marked the first time in school history that California won bowl games in consecutive seasons.

The 1992 season, however, included a new coach. After transforming the California program from a laughingstock into a national power, coach Bruce Snyder left Berkeley for Arizona State and was replaced by Keith Gilbertson. Gilbertson's squad struggled to a 4-7 record in 1992, but Dawkins was one bright spot in an otherwise forgettable year.  Dawkins was recognized a consensus first-team All-American after the season in 1992, an honor which encouraged him to forgo his senior season and enter the NFL Draft.

Professional career
He was selected in the first round of the 1993 NFL Draft by the Indianapolis Colts as the 16th overall pick and the second wide receiver chosen. In his third season with the Colts, Indianapolis won two playoff games before falling to the Pittsburgh Steelers in the AFC Championship game. He would play in two more playoff games in his career, but both were losses.

After one season in New Orleans, Dawkins signed as a free agent with the Seattle Seahawks in 1999. He enjoyed his finest personal year in 1999 when he caught 58 passes for 992 yards. After two campaigns with Seattle, Dawkins spent his final year with the Jacksonville Jaguars. His career was clearly on the decline by that point, as he made only 20 catches with the Jaguars that season. Before the 2002 season, he signed with the Minnesota Vikings, however he was released at the final cutdown and never played in the NFL again.

NFL career statistics

Life after football
Dawkins pursued a career in real estate in Sacramento, California, and later trained to become a police officer in San Jose, California.

See also 
 List of NCAA major college football yearly receiving leaders

References

External links
 Player profile

1971 births
Living people
People from Red Bank, New Jersey
Sportspeople from Sunnyvale, California
Players of American football from California
American football wide receivers
California Golden Bears football players
All-American college football players
Indianapolis Colts players
Jacksonville Jaguars players
New Orleans Saints players
Seattle Seahawks players
Minnesota Vikings players